José Magdalena Lafuente (1889 – 19 July 1977) was a Spanish cyclist. He won the second edition of the Volta a Catalunya in 1912, as well as the Spanish National Road Race Championships in 1910 and 1912.

Major results
1910
 1st  Road race, National Road Championships
1911
 2nd Overall Volta a Catalunya
1912
 1st  Overall Volta a Catalunya
1st Stages 1, 2 & 3
 1st  Road race, National Road Championships
1914
 3rd Road race, National Road Championships
1915
 3rd Road race, National Road Championships
1916
 3rd Road race, National Road Championships

References

External links

1889 births
1977 deaths
Spanish male cyclists
Cyclists from Barcelona